Iberia de Córdoba was a former Mexican football team that played in the Liga Amateur de Veracruz and the Primera Fuerza prior to the professionalization and development of the Mexican first division. The club was established in 1915 and was dissolved in 1943 when the Liga Amateur de Veracruz folded to create the Primera División . It merged with cross town rivals Veracruz Sporting Club and formed Tiburones Rojos de Veracruz.

History
Iberia de Córdoba Sporting Club was founded in 1915 in the south side of Veracruz, Mexico by the Spaniards residing there at the time. The brothers Olavarrieta exported of coffee. Due to this the brothers decided to hire a large number of young Spanish immigrants already living partly in Córdoba and partly in the port city of Veracruz and brought to Cordoba. The brothers Olivarrieta who were wealthy Spanish immigrants quickly made their presence felt by signing quality Spanish players. For the first president of the team's financing partner Santiago Olavarrieta was appointed.

The club represented medium-low class of Veracruz.

In 1943 after the professionalization of football in Mexico the clubs decided to merge with their cross town rivals Veracruz Sporting Club and create Tiburones Rojos de Veracruz in order to enroll in the Primera División de México.

Honors
Liga Amateur de Veracruz
Winners (4): 1919–20, 1921–22, 1925–26, 1931–32

References

See also
Football in Mexico

Defunct football clubs in Veracruz
Association football clubs established in 1915
1915 establishments in Mexico
1943 disestablishments in Mexico
Association football clubs disestablished in 1943
Primera Fuerza teams